Charles Henri David (May 4, 1906 – March 1, 1999) was a film director. He worked as an assistant to Zoltan Korda for a number of years. He was head of Pathe in France and worked with Jean Renoir and René Clair. He was with the French army until 1940.

At Universal he sold a story of his, "A Fairy Tale Murder", to Universal, who let him direct it as River Gang.

He was the third husband to Deanna Durbin. They married in December 1950, after she had lived with him in France for eight months, and they stayed married until his death, having one child. They settled in France.

Select filmography
La Chienne (1931) aka The Bitch – production manager
Baby's Laxative (1931) – production manager
American Love (1931) – line producer
Mam'zelle Nitouche (1931) – production manager
Fantomas (1932) aka It's in the Bag – production manager
L'affaire est dans le sac (1932) – production manager
Trois... six... neuf (1937) – production manager
Bizarre, Bizarre (1937) – production manager
The Rebel Son (1938) – producer
The Four Feathers (1939) – producer's assistant
The Thief of Bagdad (1940) – associate director
The Jungle Book (1942) – producer's assistant
Lady on a Train (1945) – director
River Gang (1945) -producer, director, story
La fin des Pyrénées (1970) – executive producer

References

External links
Charles David at IMDb

°1906 births

1999 deaths
French film directors
1906 births
Place of birth missing